Cynthidia is a genus of beetles in the family Carabidae, containing the following species:

 Cynthidia cancellata (Brulle, 1843)
 Cynthidia croceipes (Perty, 1830)
 Cynthidia foveata Chaudoir, 1873
 Cynthidia majorina Straneo, 1951
 Cynthidia octocoela Chaudoir, 1873
 Cynthidia planodiscus (Perty, 1830)

References

Pterostichinae